Angela Ginovska (born 31 August 1993) is a Macedonian footballer who plays as a defender for the North Macedonia national team.

International career
Ginovska made her debut for the North Macedonia national team on 25 October 2009, against Belarus.

References

1993 births
Living people
Women's association football defenders
Macedonian women's footballers
North Macedonia women's international footballers